Dahagram–Angarpota is a Bangladeshi enclave in India about  away from the border of Bangladesh. It had a population of 17,000 people in 2014. Dahagram–Angarpota was the largest and is the only remaining Bangladeshi enclave after the 2015 resolution of the India–Bangladesh enclaves issue. The enclave is connected to mainland Bangladesh by the Tin Bigha Corridor, which is situated in Patgram Upazila of Lamonirhat district. It is surrounded by Cooch Behar district of India's West Bengal state. The Teesta river flows on its western side.

History
In 1954 Pakistan and India signed a treaty over the Dahagram–Angarpota and Berubari enclaves. Dahagram–Angarpota, according to the treaty, was meant to go to Pakistan while Berubari was to be divided between India and Pakistan, North Berubari going to India and South Berubari to Pakistan. The treaty was not ratified as it faced legal challenges in India. In 1971 Bangladesh became independent from Pakistan. Bangladesh and India proceeded to sign a new treaty. The 1974 Indira-Mujib pact was signed which protected the status of Dahagram–Angarpota and in return Bangladesh gave India the whole of Berubari village. This was challenged in Bangladeshi courts but it was resolved quickly and the treaty ratified in 1974. The treaty provided Bangladesh with the Tin Bigha Corridor that connected the enclave with mainland Bangladesh. The corridor started functioning in 1992 when it was open for a few hours every day. Since 2011 the corridor has been open for 23 hours a day. The corridor is closed for one hour every day so that the Border Security Force of India can raise the Indian flag in the corridor. BSF controls the corridor and the gates. The area has seen limited development through the opening of a clinic, school, and market.

Demographics 
Dahagram Union had a population of 10,040 as per the 2011 census, living in two villages: Dahagram and Angarpota. Nearly the entire population is Muslim, with a religious minority of 56 Hindus.

See also
 Bangladesh–India border

References

Geography of Bangladesh
Bangladesh–India border
Bangladesh–India relations
Enclaves and exclaves